Apertifusus frenguellii is a species of sea snail, a marine gastropod mollusc in the family Fasciolariidae, the spindle snails, the tulip snails and their allies.

Description

Distribution
This marine species occurs off Argentina.

References

 Carcelles A. (1953). Nuevas especies de gastrópodos marinos de las Repúblicas Oriental del Uruguay y Argentina. Comunicaciones Zoologicas del Museo de Historia Natural de Montevideo. 4(70): 1-16, 5 pls
 Vermeij G.J. & Snyder M.A. (2018). Proposed genus-level classification of large species of Fusininae (Gastropoda, Fasciolariidae). Basteria. 82(4-6): 57–82

frenguellii
Gastropods described in 1953